John Alexander Kennedy Cochran (15 July 1909 – 15 June 1987) was a South African cricketer who played in one Test match in 1931.

Cochran was a right-arm medium-fast bowler and a tail-end right-handed batsman. Having played only four previous first-class matches and never having taken more than three wickets in an innings, he was picked for South Africa for the fifth and final Test of the 1930–31 England tour at Durban, where South Africa needed only to draw to seal the series victory. Cochran took no wickets, but the draw was achieved. He played only one further first-class match.

References

1909 births
1987 deaths
South Africa Test cricketers
South African cricketers
Griqualand West cricketers
Gauteng cricketers